This is a list of Oklahoma State Cowboys football seasons. The Cowboys are part of the National Collegiate Athletic Association (NCAA) Division I Football Bowl Subdivision (FBS). Since their inception in 1901, the Cowboys have played in over 1,100 games through over a century of play along with 28 bowl games, with one interruption occurring in 1902.

Year-by-year records

References

Oklahoma State
Oklahoma State Cowboys football seasons